German submarine U-59 was a Type IIC U-boat of Nazi Germany's Kriegsmarine that served in the Second World War. She was built by Deutsche Werke AG, Kiel. Ordered on 17 June 1937, she was laid down on 5 October as yard number 258. She was launched on 12 October 1938 and commissioned on 4 March 1939 under the command of Oberleutnant zur See Harald Jürst.

Design
German Type IIC submarines were enlarged versions of the original Type IIs. U-59 had a displacement of  when at the surface and  while submerged. She had two shafts and two  propellers.

U-59 was fitted with three  torpedo tubes at the bow, five torpedoes or up to twelve Type A torpedo mines, and a  anti-aircraft gun. The boat had a complement of 25.

Service history
The boat began her career by training with the 5th U-boat Flotilla from March to December 1939. She was declared operational on 1 January 1940 with the 1st flotilla. She was assigned to the 22nd flotilla on 1 January 1941, then the 19th flotilla on 1 July 1944. The last two assignments were as a "school" boat.

She carried out 13 patrols in which she sank 17 merchant ships, two auxiliary warships, and damaged a tanker. A further victim was declared a "total loss".

She was scuttled in the Kiel Arsenal at the end of the war. The wreck was broken up in 1945.

Operational career

1st, 2nd and 3rd patrols
For her first patrol, U-59 departed Helgoland, (the German island in the North Sea), on 29 August 1939, before war was declared. She arrived in Kiel on 11 September after an uneventful trip.

Her second sortie saw her first success, sinking the British trawler Lynx II west of the Shetland Islands on 28 October 1939.

Her third patrol also passed without incident.

4th, 5th and 6th patrols
U-59 returned to Germany, but this time to Kiel.

Her fifth outing took her from Kiel (leaving on 14 January 1940), to the vicinity of the British East Anglian coast. She returned, empty-handed, to Wilhelmshaven on 22 January.

The boat's sixth patrol saw her return to the East Anglian coast, but this time she was more successful, sinking Ellen M. on 1 February 1940 and Creofield and Portlet, both on 2 February.

7th, 8th, 9th and 10th patrols
Her seventh effort was uneventful, but her eighth, which commenced on 31 March 1940 was, at 38 days, her longest. She sank Navarra on 6 April, but was in turn attacked by a submarine on 5 May; a torpedo track was seen 100 m from her stern. She returned to Kiel on 7 May.

The submarine's ninth patrol was marked with the sinking of Sigyn on 1 August 1940 west of Oban (on the Scottish west coast). She completed the operation by docking at Bergen in occupied Norway on 4 August.

U-59s tenth sortie began on 8 August 1940, it finished at Lorient on the French Atlantic coast on the 19th.

11th, 12th and 13th patrols
On her eleventh patrol, the boat damaged two ships, San Gabriel and Anadara, both on 30 August 1940 and both west of Scotland.

Her twelfth effort, west of Ireland and Scotland, was followed by the journey from Lorient back to Bergen.

Her thirteenth and last operational patrol was a fairly straightforward affair: from Bergen, down the Norwegian coast arriving in Kiel on 20 October 1940.

Summary of raiding history

References

Notes

Citations

Bibliography

External links
 
 

German Type II submarines
U-boats commissioned in 1939
World War II submarines of Germany
1938 ships
Ships built in Kiel
Maritime incidents in May 1945
Operation Regenbogen (U-boat)